The Blood of the Redeemer is a 1460–1465 tempera on panel painting, now in the National Gallery, London.

It shows a young Christ holding his cross and an angel collecting the blood from the wound in his side in a chalice similar to that used at mass. This indicates that the work was perhaps originally used as the door to a church tabernacle. There were other angels behind Christ, but these were later painted out with clouds for unknown reasons. In the background are two bas reliefs in ancient Roman style, whose imagery may relate to the painting's themes and meanings.

1465 paintings
Paintings by Giovanni Bellini
Collections of the National Gallery, London